Niesten may refer to:

 Niesten (crater), an impact crater on Mars
 Coen Niesten (born 1938), Dutch racing cyclist
 Louis Niesten (1844–1920), Belgian astronomer